Hattie is a television film about the life of British comic actress Hattie Jacques, played by Ruth Jones, her marriage to John Le Mesurier (Robert Bathurst) and her affair with their lodger John Schofield (Aidan Turner).  First broadcast in January 2011, it became the most watched programme on BBC Four ever and defeated biopic The Curse of Steptoe, which had held the record since 2008. Jacques' son Robin Le Mesurier later described Jones' performance as "(having) captured my mother perfectly".

Cast
 Ruth Jones as Hattie Jacques
 Robert Bathurst as John Le Mesurier
 Aidan Turner as John Schofield
 Jeany Spark as Joan Malin
 Jay Simpson as Bruce
 Graham Fellows as Eric Sykes
 Marcia Warren as Esma Cannon
 Stephen Critchlow as Gerald Thomas
 Susy Kane as Young Actress
 Lewis MacLeod as Eamonn Andrews
 Brian Pettifer as Ron
 James Martin as Reg

References

External links

http://news.bbc.co.uk/1/hi/wales/8685253.stm

2011 television films
2011 films
2011 biographical drama films
Films about adultery in the United Kingdom
BBC television dramas
Biographical films about actors
British biographical drama films
2010s English-language films
2010s British films
British drama television films